The First Battle of Mantinea of 418 BC was an engagement during the Peloponnesian War.  Sparta and its allies defeated an army led by Argos and Athens.

Background
After the alliance between the Argives, Achaeans, Eleans, and Athens, the Spartans were defeated in the Olympic Games of 420 B.C. After the invasion of Epidaurus by Athens and its allies, Sparta chose to retaliate, fearing their potential alliance with Corinth. The army that was amassed was, according to Thucydides, "the best army ever assembled in Greece to that time". The Spartan king Agis (son of Archidamus) concluded the first campaign with a truce, without explaining his actions to the army or his allies. Soon after the Argives denounced the truce and resumed the war, capturing the key town of Orchomenus. As a result, Spartans directed their focus towards Agis, who avoided a 100,000 drachmas fine and the destruction of his house. Agis managed to forestall the punishment, promising to redeem himself with a victory elsewhere.  The ephors consented but placed Agis under the supervision of ten advisors, called symbouloi, whose consent was required for whatever military action he wished to take.

Prelude
Late in 418, the Argives and their allies marched against Tegea, where a faction was prepared to turn the city over to the Argive alliance. Tegea controlled the exit from Laconia. Enemy control of the town would mean that the Spartans would be unable to move out of their home city and would result in the demise of the Peloponnesian coalition that fought the Archidamian War.

Agis marched the whole of the Spartan army, together with the neodamodeis and everyone who was able to fight in Sparta into Tegea where he was joined by his allies from Arcadia. Agis sent for help from his northern allies, Corinth, Boeotia, Phocis, and Locris. However, the northern army could not arrive quickly at the scene, as they had not expected the call and would have to pass through enemy territory (Argos and Orchomenus). On the whole, the army of the allies of Sparta would have numbered around 9,000 hoplites.

In the meantime, the Eleans attacked Lepreum, a contested border town with Sparta. They chose to withdraw their contingent of 3,000 hoplites. Agis took advantage of the withdrawal and sent a sixth of his army, with the youngest and the oldest hoplites home to guard Sparta proper. They were called back soon after, as Agis or the symbouloi realized that the Eleans would soon be back on the side of the Argives, but did not arrive in time for the battle.

Agis could have bided his time inside the walls of Tegea, waiting for his northern allies. However, he was already discredited and could not show the slightest sign of shying away from the battle. So he invaded the territory around Mantinea, about 15 km north of Tegea and a member of the Argive alliance, to force a pitched battle with the Argives and their allies. The Argive army, however, was situated on the ground "steep and hard to get at" and would not be drawn into battle, probably because the grain harvest had already been stored (the battle probably took place at the end of September 418). Agis, who was desperate for a victory to redeem his embarrassment at Argos, charged ahead; but according to Thucydides, when the armies had closed to a stone's throw, "one of the elder Spartans" (the symboulos Pharax, according to Diodorus) advised him not to try to correct one error (his former defeat) with another.  The Spartans therefore retreated and went off to find a way to draw out the Argive army to a battle. So they diverted the Sarandapotamos River to the bed of the smaller Zanovistas river, or, they just filled up the sinkholes in which Zanovistas flowed, in order to flood the Mantinean territory.

Instead of allowing Mantinea to be flooded, the Argive army moved quicker than the Spartans anticipated, as the Argive hoplites were angry at their generals for not pursuing the Spartan army and accused them of treason. They surprised their enemies by drawing up as the Spartans emerged from a nearby wood. The Spartans quickly organized themselves, with no time to wait for their other allies. Brasidas' veterans (Brasidas himself had been killed at the Battle of Amphipolis), and the Sciritae (an elite unit of Spartan troops) formed the left wing, the Spartans, Arcadians, Heraeans, and Maenalians in the centre, and the Tegeans, who were fighting for their homeland took the position of honour on the right wing. The Argive lines were formed by the Mantineans on the right, the Argives in the centre, and the Athenians on the left. Thucydides did not know the exact numbers of men on each side but estimated that there were about 9,000 men on the Spartan side (the Spartan army must have numbered about 3,500, with 600 Sciritae, about 2,000 neodamodeis, and Brasideans and about 3,000 Arcadians on the whole) with somewhat fewer men on the Argive and Athenian side (about 8,000), according to Donald Kagan. Other scholars, such as Victor Davis Hanson, give slightly bigger numbers.

The battle
As the battle began, each side's right wing began to outflank the other's left, due to the erratic movements of each hoplite trying to cover himself with the shield of the man beside him. Agis tried to strengthen the line by ordering the Sciritae and his left to break off contact with the rest of the army and match the length of the Argive line. To cover the void created, he ordered the companies of Hipponoidas and Aristocles to leave their positions in the center and cover the line. This however was not achieved, for the two captains were unable, or unwilling to complete these maneuvers on such short notice. Donald Kagan considers it an ill-advised move and gives credit to the two captains for disobeying orders that could have lost the battle for the Spartans. Others considered that the original move could have succeeded.

In any case, the Mantineans and the right part of the Argives, the elite Argive Thousand, entered the gap and routed the Brasideans and the Sciritae, and pursued them for a long distance. In the meantime, the Tegeans and the regular Spartan army routed the Argives and Arcadians in the center. Most of them did not stand to fight, but they fled as the Spartans approached; some were trampled in their hurry to get away before the enemy reached them. While the Argive-Arcadian center was being chased off the field, the Athenians who formed the left were beginning to get encircled. Their cavalry prevented a rout, allowing the Athenian infantry to retreat in good order. Agis did not pursue the Athenians but turned the center and right around and marched to give support to his hard-pressed left. The Mantineans were chased off the field with heavy losses while the Spartans allowed the Argive Thousand to escape virtually unharmed.

The Spartans did not pursue the enemy for long after the battle was won.

Aftermath
The Argive side lost about 1,100 men (700 Argives and Arcadians, 200 Athenians and 200 Mantineans), and the Spartans about 300.

The Spartans sent an embassy to Argos and the Argives accepted a truce by the terms of which they gave up Orchomenus, and all their hostages and joined up with the Spartans in evicting the Athenians from Epidaurus. They also renounced their alliance with Elis and Athens. After deposing the democratic government of Sicyon, the Argive Thousand staged a coup against the democratic rule of Argos. The democrats' morale was low because of the bad performance of the common army and the Athenians in the battle. 

In more general terms, the battle was a considerable boost to the Lacedaemonians' morale and prestige, because after the disaster at Pylos they had been considered cowardly and incompetent in battle. Their success at Mantinea marked a reversal of the trend.

Sources
Thucydides, The Peloponnesian War. Athens, Philippos Pappas, Nikolaos Philippas; Athens, Papyros. 1953.
Kagan, Donald. (2003). The Peloponnesian War. New York: Viking Press. .
Victor Davis Hanson. A War Like No Other: How the Athenians and Spartans Fought the Peloponnesian War. Random House, October 2005.

Notes

Mantinea (418 BC)
418 BC
410s BC conflicts
Ancient Arcadia
Mantinea 418
Mantinea 418
Mantinea 418